Filip Trejbal (born January 5, 1985 in Jilemnice) is an alpine skier from the Czech Republic.  He competed for the Czech Republic at the 2006 Winter Olympics and the 2010 Winter Olympics.  His best result was a 28th place in the combined in 2010.

World Cup results

Season standings

Results per discipline

 standings through 20 Jan 2019

World Championship results

Olympic results

References

External links

1985 births
Living people
Czech male alpine skiers
Olympic alpine skiers of the Czech Republic
Alpine skiers at the 2006 Winter Olympics
Alpine skiers at the 2010 Winter Olympics
Alpine skiers at the 2014 Winter Olympics
Universiade medalists in alpine skiing
Universiade silver medalists for the Czech Republic
Medalists at the 2007 Winter Universiade
People from Jilemnice
Sportspeople from the Liberec Region